Ogdensburg Harbor Light is a privately owned lighthouse on the St. Lawrence River, listed on the National Park Service's Maritime Heritage Program as Lighthouse to visit. and as one of New York's Historic Light Stations. In 2016 it was listed on the National Register of Historic Places.

History
An addition was made to the tower in 1900.

Cultural
The Archives Center at the Smithsonian National Museum of American History has a collection (#1055) of souvenir postcards of lighthouses and has digitized 272 of these and made them available online.  These include postcards of Ogdensburg Harbor Light  with links to customized nautical charts provided by National Oceanographic and Atmospheric Administration.

See also

List of lighthouses in the United States
National Register of Historic Places listings in St. Lawrence County, New York

References

Further reading
Berger, Todd R., Lighthouses of the Great Lakes, (Stillwater, MN: Voyageur Press, 2002), pp. 145–146

External links

 Lighthouse Friends site
 
 National Park Service Historic Lighthouses
 NPS Ogdensburg Light 
 Rudy & Alice

Lighthouses completed in 1834
Lighthouses on the National Register of Historic Places in New York (state)
Transportation buildings and structures in St. Lawrence County, New York
National Register of Historic Places in St. Lawrence County, New York
1834 establishments in New York (state)